Wulfstan II, Archbishop of York wrote some works in Latin, and numerous works in Old English, then the vernacular.  He has also been credited with a few short poems. His works can generally be divided into homiletic, legal, and philosophical (or socio-political) categories.

Homiletic

'Block' 1 ("Eschatological Homilies")

 De Anticristo  (Latin, Bethurum Ia)
 De Anticristo  (Old English, Bethurum Ib)
 Lectio Sancti Evangelii Secundum Matheum  (Old English, Bethurum II)
 Secundum Lucam (Old English, Bethurum III)
 De Temporibus Anticristi  (Old English, Bethurum IV)
 Secundum Marcum  (Old English, Bethurum V)

'Block' 2 ("The Christian Faith")

 Incipiunt Sermones Lupi Episcopi (Old English, Bethurum VI)
 De Fide Catholica (Old English, Bethurum VII)
 To Eallum Folke (Old English, Bethurum VIIa)
 Incipit de Baptisma (Latin, Bethurum VIIIa)
 Dominica Quaterna vel Quando Volueris (Old English, Bethurum VIIIb)
 Sermo de Baptismate (Old English, Bethurum VIIIc)
 De Septiformi Spiritu (Old English, Bethurum IX; a reworking of a homily by Ælfric)
 De Regula Canonicorum (Old English, Bethurum Xa; a translation of chapter 145 of the 816 Council of Aachen)
 De Cristianitate (Latin, Bethurum Xb)
 Her Ongynð Be Cristendome (Old English, Bethurum XC; a reworking of Xa and Xb)
 Incipit de Visione Isaie Prophete Quam Vidit Super Idam et Hierusalem (Latin & Old English, Bethurum XI)
 De Falsis Deis (Old English, Bethurum XII; a reworking of a homily by Ælfric)

'Block' 3 ("Archiepiscopal Functions")

 Sermo ad Populum (Old English, Bethurum XIII)
 Sermo in Quadragesima (Old English, Bethurum XIV)
 Sermo de Cena Domini (Old English, Bethurum XV)
 Verba Ezechielis Prophete de Pastoribus non recte Agentibus (Latin, Bethurum XVIa)
 Verba Ezechielis Prophete de Pigris aut Timidis vel Negligentibus Pastoribus (Old English, Bethurum XVIb; a translation of XVIa)
 Lectio Secundum Lucam (Old English, Bethurum XVII)
 De Dedicatione Ecclesiae (Old English, Bethurum XVIII)

'Block' 4 ("Evil Days")

 Be Godcundre Warnunge (Old English, Bethurum XIX)
 Sermo Lupi ad Anglos  (Old English, Bethurum XX; in multiple versions written at different times)
 Her is gyt Rihtlic Warnung ond Soðlic Myngung Ðeode to Ðearfe (Old English, Bethurum XXI)
 
Miscellaneous

 Untitled (Napier I)
 Untitled (Napier XXIII)
 Untitled (Napier XXIV)
 To Folce (Napier XXV)
 To Eallum Folce (Napier XXVII)
 Be Mistlican Gelimpan (Napier XXXV)
 To Eallum Folce (Napier XXXVI)
 Her Is Gyt Oþer Wel God Eaca (Napier XXXVIII)
 ?Ðis Man Gerædde, đa se Micela Here Com to Lande (Napier XXXIX)
 Larspel and Scriftboc (Napier XLVII; first part only)
 ?Larspel (Napier L)
 To Eallan Folke (Napier LI)
 To Mæssepreostum (Napier LII)
 To Mæssepreostum (Napier LIII)
 Sermo Lupi (Napier LIX)
 Be Hæðendome (Napier LX)
 Be Cristendome (Napier LXI)

 ?Admonitio episcoporum utilis (Latin; ed. Hall; in two versions)
 ?Admonitio spiritalis doctrinae (Latin; ed. Cross)
 ?Contra iniquos iudices et falsos testes (Latin; ed. Hall)
 ?De adiutorio Dei et libero arbitrio (Latin; ed. Hall)
 ?De blasphemia (Latin; ed. Elliot )
 ?De coniugio antiquo (Latin; ed. Cross-Hamer)
 ? (Latin; ed. Hall)
 ?De decimis dandis (Latin; ed. Hall)
 ?De diversitate ordinum (Latin; ed. Elliot )
 ? (Latin; ed. Hall)
 ?De ieiunio quattuor temporum (Latin; ed. Cross)
 ?De paenitentia communi pro quacumque tribulatione (Latin; ed. Elliot )
 ?De pastore et praedicatore (Latin; ed. Elliot )
 ?De rapinis ecclesiasticarum rerum (Latin; ed. Cross; in two versions)
 ?De resurrectione mortuorum (Latin; ed. Hall)
 ?De veneratione sacerdotum (Latin; ed. Elliot ; in multiple versions)
 ?In nomine Domini (Latin; ed. di Sciacca)
 ?Sermo ad coniugatos et filios (Latin; ed. Hall)
 ?Sermo ad viduas (Latin; ed. Hall)
 ?Sermo sancti Augustini de baptismo non iterando (Latin; ed. Hall)

Legal

 Episcopus (Old English)
 The Laws of Edward and Guthrum (Old English)
 ?The Northumbrian Priests' Law (Old English)
 The Canons of Edgar (Old English)
 ?Collectio canonum Wigorniensis (Latin; a.k.a. Wulfstan's Canon Law Collection, or the Excerptiones pseudo-Ecgberhti)
 Ethelred's legislation, 1008, King's Enham (Latin & Old English; survives as VAtr, VIAtr, VIAtrLat, XAtr)
 Að (Old English)
 Mircna laga (Old English)
 Norðleoda laga (Old English)
 Ethelred's legislation, ca. 1009, Bath (Latin, VIIaAtr)
 Hadbot (Old English)
 Geþyncðo (Old English)
 Grið (Old English)
 Ethelred's legislation, 1014 (Old English, VIIIAtr, ?IXAtr)
 Cnut's legislation, 1018 (Old English, Cn 1018)
 Cnut's legislation, 1020 (Old English, Cn 1020)
 Cnut's legislation (secular), ca. 1021 (Old English, ICn)
 Cnut's legislation (ecclesiastical), ca. 1021 (Old English, IICn)

He also made revisions to

 King Athelstan's tithe ordinance (IAs)
 Edmund's London code (IEm)
 Edgar's Andover code (II-IIIEg)

Philosophical

 The Institutes of Polity I (Old English; original version)
 The Institutes of Polity II (Old English; revision)

Poetical

 Qui legis hunc titulum (Latin; verses praising Wulfstan)
 Poem on King Edgar's Succession (Old English; Anglo-Saxon Chronicle E, s.a. 959)
 Poem on King Edward's Succession (Old English; Anglo-Saxon Chronicle D, s.a. 975)

Notes

References

Texts

Studies 

 
 
 
 
 
 
 
 
 
 
 
 
 
 
 
 
 
 
 
 

Old English literature
Early medieval Latin literature